Samuel Lofquist (born March 15, 1990) is an American professional ice hockey defenseman who is currently playing for Kookoo in the Finnish Liiga.

Playing career 
Having attended the United States National U18 Team program, Lofquist enrolled at the University of Minnesota in 2008, left the Gophers in the course of his sophomore season and then signed with the Guelph Storm Hockey Club of the Ontario Hockey League in November 2009.

Following a short stint with the South Carolina Stingrays of the East Coast Hockey League (ECHL) in 2011, he took up an offer from IK Oskarshamn of Sweden's second division Allsvenskan. He stayed there until the end of the 2012–13 campaign, establishing himself as a defenseman with scoring ability and then was signed by fellow Allsvenskan team Djurgårdens IF for the 2013–14 season.

Lofquist received a contract offer from SaiPa Lappeenranta of Finland's top-flight Liiga after having completed the season with Djurgårdens IF and would spend two years with SaiPa, competing both in Liiga and in the Champions Hockey League.

In May 2016, Lofquist penned a deal with Torpedo Nizhny Novgorod of the Kontinental Hockey League (KHL) for the 2016–17 season, registering 13 points in 43 games.

After spending the 2017–18 season in Switzerland with EHC Biel of the National League, Lofquist opted to halt his 6-year European career and return to North America as a free agent.

On July 30, 2018, he agreed to a one-year AHL contract with the San Antonio Rampage, affiliate to the St. Louis Blues of the NHL. In returning to the AHL for the first time in seven years, Lofquist began the 2018–19 season on the Rampage's blueline second-pairing. Appearing in just 9 games through December, Lofquist opted to leave the Rampage and return abroad after securing a contract for the remainder of the season with Chinese KHL participant, Kunlun Red Star on December 25, 2018. Lofquist played out the remainder of the season with the Red Star, posting 11 points in just 18 games.

On May 1, 2019, Lofquist opted to continue in the KHL, agreeing to a two-year contract on the opening day of free agency with Russian club, HC Sibir Novosibirsk.

Career statistics

Regular season and playoffs

International

References

External links

1990 births
Living people
American expatriate ice hockey players in China
American expatriate ice hockey players in Finland
American expatriate ice hockey players in Sweden
American expatriate ice hockey players in Switzerland
American expatriate ice hockey players in Russia
American men's ice hockey defensemen
EHC Biel players
Djurgårdens IF Hockey players
Guelph Storm players
Houston Aeros (1994–2013) players
Ice hockey players from Wisconsin
HC Kunlun Red Star players
Linköping HC players
Minnesota Golden Gophers men's ice hockey players
IK Oskarshamn players
People from Somerset, Wisconsin
SaiPa players
San Antonio Rampage players
South Carolina Stingrays players
Torpedo Nizhny Novgorod players